In Greek mythology, Derinoe (Ancient Greek: Δηρινόη) was one of the Amazons, a race of warrior-women. She came with their queen, Penthesilia to the Trojan War.

Mythology 
During the siege of Troy, Derinoe killed the Achaean warrior Laogonus and was in turn smote in the throat and shoulder by the spear of Ajax the Lesser.

Notes

References 

 Quintus Smyrnaeus, The Fall of Troy translated by Way. A. S. Loeb Classical Library Volume 19. London: William Heinemann, 1913. Online version at theio.com
 Quintus Smyrnaeus, The Fall of Troy. Arthur S. Way. London: William Heinemann; New York: G.P. Putnam's Sons. 1913. Greek text available at the Perseus Digital Library.

Amazons of the Trojan war